Center (originally called Tampico) is an unincorporated community in Taylor Township, Howard County, Indiana, United States.  Center is a suburb of Kokomo and is a part of the Kokomo, Indiana Metropolitan Statistical Area.

History
Center was laid out in 1852. It was originally named Tampico, after the Mexican port, but because there is another Tampico in Jackson County it was renamed Centre (later Center) for its central location in the county.

Education 
Center is served by the Taylor Community Schools Corporation.  Taylor High School competes in the Mid-Indiana Conference (MIC) for athletics.

Geography

References

Unincorporated communities in Howard County, Indiana
Kokomo, Indiana metropolitan area
Unincorporated communities in Indiana